During the 2005–06 Swiss football season, Grasshopper Club Zürich competed in the Swiss Super League.

Season summary
Manager Hanspeter Latour left in early January to take charge of German club Köln. Bulgarian legend Krasimir Balakov was appointed to replace him. Balakov led the Zürich club to 4th place, one place lower than the previous season.

First-team squad
Squad at end of season

Left club during season

Results

UEFA Cup

Second qualifying round

3–3 on aggregate, Grasshoppers win on away goals

First round

Grasshoppers won 4-1 on aggregate.

Group stage

References

Notes

Grasshopper Club Zürich seasons
Grasshopper Club Zürich